is a town located in Watarai District, Mie Prefecture, Japan. , the town had an estimated population of 15,353 in 5844 households and a population density of 380 persons per km².

Geography
Tamaki is an inland municipality, located in eastern Kii Peninsula, near the geographic center of Mie Prefecture. Springtime in Tamaki-chō features cherry blossoms, rice fields, persimmon trees, nurseries and vegetable fields growing daikon, cabbage and more. There are many forests which have been designated as wildlife protection areas.

Neighboring municipalities
Mie Prefecture
Ise
Watarai
Taki
Meiwa

Climate
Tamaki has a Humid subtropical climate (Köppen Cfa) characterized by warm summers and cool winters with light to no snowfall.  The average annual temperature in Tamaki is 15.5 °C. The average annual rainfall is 1856 mm with September as the wettest month. The temperatures are highest on average in August, at around 26.3 °C, and lowest in January, at around 5.1 °C.

Demographics
Per Japanese census data, the population of Tamaki has been increasing steadily over the past 60 years.

History

The area of present-day Tamaki was part of ancient Shima Province, but was transferred to Ise Province in 1582. Tamaki was the site of a Sengoku period Japanese castle, Tamaru Castle, which dominated the surrounding area, including access to the Ise Grand Shrines. The castle was initially built by Kitabatake Chikafusa of the Kitabatake Clan in 1336, to serve as a base of operations for Emperor Go-Daigo's Southern Court during the conflict between the Northern and Southern Court known as the Nanboku-chō period. The castle was destroyed in the early Meiji period.

Tamaru Town was created within Watarai District of Mie Prefecture with the establishment of the modern municipalities system on April 1, 1889.  It merged with the neighboring village of Higashitokida and assumed its present name on April 10, 1955.

Government
Tamaki has a mayor-council form of government with a directly elected mayor and a unicameral city council of 13 members. Tamaki, collectively with the other municipalities of Watari District, contributes two members to the Mie Prefectural Assembly. In terms of national politics, the town is part of Mie 4th district of the lower house of the Diet of Japan.

Economy
The town serves as a commercial center for the surrounding region. "Tamaki Pork" is a local speciality.

Education
Tamaki has four public elementary schools and one public middle school operated by the town government. The town does not have a high school. There is one special education school for the handicapped operated by the Mie Prefectural Board of Education.

Transportation

Railway
 JR Tōkai – Sangū Line

Highway
 Ise Expressway

Sister city relations
 – Nanjō, Okinawa (since 1993)

References

External links

Tamaki official website 

Towns in Mie Prefecture
Tamaki, Mie